Broome is an unincorporated community in Sterling County, Texas, United States.  Its elevation is 2,211 feet (674 m).  It lies southeast of Sterling City, the county seat of Sterling County.

References

Unincorporated communities in Sterling County, Texas
Unincorporated communities in Texas